The 2017 Overton's 301 is a Monster Energy NASCAR Cup Series race held on July 16, 2017 at New Hampshire Motor Speedway in Loudon, New Hampshire. Contested over 301 laps on the  speedway, it was the 19th race of the 2017 Monster Energy NASCAR Cup Series season.

Report

Background

New Hampshire Motor Speedway is a  oval speedway located in Loudon, New Hampshire, which has hosted NASCAR racing annually since the early 1990s, as well as the longest-running motorcycle race in North America, the Loudon Classic. Nicknamed "The Magic Mile", the speedway is often converted into a  road course, which includes much of the oval.

The track was originally the site of Bryar Motorsports Park before being purchased and redeveloped by Bob Bahre. The track is currently one of eight major NASCAR tracks owned and operated by Speedway Motorsports.

Entry list

First practice

Qualifying

Martin Truex Jr. scored the pole for the race with a time of 28.621 and a speed of  after Kyle Larson was disqualified after failing post-qualifying inspection.

Qualifying results

Practice (post-qualifying)

Second practice

Final practice

Race

First stage
Martin Truex Jr. led the field to the green flag at 3:17 p.m. Jimmie Johnson, who started second, beat him to the line on the initial start, earning him a pass-through penalty. Kyle Larson, who started last after failing post-qualifying inspection, broke into the top-10 on Lap 30. Truex had a lead of six seconds when caution flew for the first time on Lap 36, a scheduled competition caution. He and most of the cars near the front opted to stay out, while a few cars pitted. Erik Jones made contact with Kasey Kahne exiting pit road, cutting down his left-front tire that went undetected.

When the race restarted on Lap 41, the left-front tire on Jones' car failed entering Turn 3 and with no inner-liner in the left-front, which NASCAR doesn't run at tracks the size of and/or smaller than Loudon, rather than the tire simply un-chord, it sent his car into the outside wall, bringing out the second caution.

Back to green on Lap 47, this green run went 21 laps before caution flew for the third time when Cole Whitt blew an engine in Turn 1. A few of the lead cars, such as Kyle Busch, Denny Hamlin and Kevin Harvick, short-pitted the end of the first stage.

The first stage ended on a two-lap dash to the finish that was won by Truex, with caution #4 flying moments later on Lap 76 for the end of the stage. Busch, who pitted under the previous caution, took the lead when Truex hit pit road. The race was red-flagged for five minutes and 29 seconds under this caution for a hole in Turn 3.

Second stage
The race went back green on Lap 84, only for caution #5 to fly four laps later when Austin Dillon made contact with Ricky Stenhouse Jr. and spun out in Turn 4. Returning to green on Lap 93, it went green the remainder of the second stage that concluded on Lap 151, won by Busch. That brought out the sixth caution, though. Hamlin exited pit road with the race lead.

Final stage

Restarting on Lap 158, Truex reeled in and passed Hamlin to retake the lead on Lap 175. The race was totally in his control, until a flat right-front tire forced him to hit pit road earlier than planned, handing the lead to Busch with 83 laps to go. Running on much fresher tires, he quickly un-lapped himself with 71 to go just as the leaders started hitting pit road. Busch pitted from the lead with 63 to go, handing the lead to Dale Earnhardt Jr., who pitted with 55 to go, cycling the lead back to Truex. During the pit cycle, Busch was handed a pass-through penalty for speeding on pit road.

But while the tire advantage played in his favor in the 28 laps he worked to get back to the lead, it turned against him after the pit cycle. Matt Kenseth cut the gap and edged out Truex at the line to take the lead with 41 to go. Caution flew for the seventh time a lap later when Ryan Newman spun out in Turn 2. Kenseth exited pit road first, but did so taking only right-side tires, which proved costly. Hamlin and Truex, who both took four, followed Kenseth out in second and third.  Dale Earnhardt Jr. stayed out to assume the lead.

Restarting with 35 to go, Hamlin took the lead from Kenseth exiting Turn 4 with 33 to go. Larson took over second with 23 to go, closed the gap to less than two seconds with 16 to go and less than a second with nine to go. He ran into lapped traffic with seven to go and the gap didn't change for a lap. This proved key to Hamlin pulling away, even when Larson closed the gap to three car-lengths with three to go, and driving on to victory.

Post-race
During the pre-race show, Daniel Suárez gave a fan a box of Dunkin Donuts, a competitor brand and food product of one of his sponsors, Subway. As a result, Subway terminated their sponsorship with Suárez in September.

Driver comments
Hamlin said after the race that he was doing all he "could to pace (Larson). I knew he had a very fast car. It just seemed like we were able to get off the corner pretty good and I just ran kind of a pace there which I felt comfortable with. And just in case we had a restart, they wanted to burn the tires up."

Larson said of "another hard-fought race" it was "the third time" his team started from the rear and "drove up to second. I wish we could have been a spot better again, but really proud of my team and proud of the cars that they’re bringing for me to drive each and every week. It’s been a tough couple weeks through the tech line, so if we make it through here and then have a good Tuesday at NASCAR, but we’ll see.”

Race results

Stage results

Stage 1
Laps: 75

Stage 2
Laps: 75

Final stage results

Stage 3
Laps: 151

Race statistics
 Lead changes: 6 among different drivers
 Cautions/Laps: 7 for 34
 Red flags: 1 for 5 minutes and 29 seconds
 Time of race: 3 hours, 0 minutes and 36 seconds
 Average speed:

Media

Television
NBC Sports covered the race on the television side. Rick Allen, Jeff Burton and Steve Letarte had the call in the booth for the race. Dave Burns, Marty Snider and Kelli Stavast reported from pit lane during the race.

Radio
PRN had the radio call for the race, which was simulcast on Sirius XM NASCAR Radio.

Standings after the race

Drivers' Championship standings

Manufacturers' Championship standings

Note: Only the first 16 positions are included for the driver standings.
. – Driver has clinched a position in the Monster Energy NASCAR Cup Series playoffs.

References

2017 Overton's 301
2017 Monster Energy NASCAR Cup Series
2017 in sports in New Hampshire
July 2017 sports events in the United States